The Sodegaura Power Station (袖ケ浦火力発電所) is a large gas-fired power station in Sodegaura, Chiba Prefecture, Japan. The facility generates power by utilizing one 600 MW and three 1,000 MW units, thus operating at an installed capacity of 3,600 MW, making it one of the largest power stations of its kind. All units of this facility run on natural gas.

See also 

 List of largest power stations in the world
 List of power stations in Japan

References 

Natural gas-fired power stations in Japan
Buildings and structures in Chiba Prefecture
Sodegaura
Tokyo Electric Power Company